The Lancaster Miller Affair is a 1985 Australian mini series about the relationship between Bill Lancaster and Jessie Miller.

Cast
 Kerry Mack ... Jessica 'Chubbie' Miller
 Nicholas Eadie ... Bill Lancaster
 Aaron Cull ... Haden Clarke

Production
The mini series became notorious for a clash with Australia's Actors Equity. The lead male roles of Lancaster and his friend Hayden Clarke were offered to Sam Neill and John Hargreaves, who turned them down. The producers then tested a large number of actors but claimed none of them were suitable and cast non-Australians Peter Firth, Don Batte and Joseph Bottoms. Equity objected claiming the tests of the Australian actors rejected had not been properly carried out. Shooting was put back but eventually Australians Kerry Mack, Nicholas Eadie and Wayne Cull were cast.

The shoot went for twelve weeks. $545,000 of the budget came from Film Victoria.

References

External links
The Lancaster Miller Affair at IMDb

1980s Australian television miniseries
1985 Australian television series debuts
Aviation television series
Films directed by Henri Safran
English-language television shows
1985 Australian television series endings